Östgöta nation or ÖG, as it is called informally, is a student society and one of thirteen nations at Uppsala University. Though Östgöta nation had existed in various forms previously, the nation's constitution was drawn up on 8 November 1646 and that is now considered its official date of creation.

The current nation building was completed in 1885 and renovated in 1996. The nation currently has about 2600 members, making it a mid-sized nation. Östgöta nation is, like all the other nations in Uppsala, run by students.

Notable people who have been members of the nation include Tage Danielsson, and Jöns Jacob Berzelius.

Axel Hägerström was Inspektor of the Östgöta nation from 1925 to his retirement in 1933.

Inspektors 
 Östgöta nation

See also 
 Östgöta Nation, Lund

Nations at Uppsala University
Student organizations established in the 17th century
1646 establishments in Sweden